Alexander Charles Atkins (29 January 1885 – 8 March 1978) was an Australian politician.

He was born in Hobart. In 1946 he was elected to the Tasmanian House of Assembly as a Labor member for Bass. He was defeated in 1948 but returned to the House in 1956. He was a minister from 1961 to 1969, and retired from politics in 1972. He died in Launceston.

References

1885 births
1978 deaths
Australian Labor Party members of the Parliament of Tasmania
Members of the Tasmanian House of Assembly
20th-century Australian politicians